Merstham railway station is in Merstham, Surrey, England.

History 
Merstham was on a stretch of line between Croydon and Redhill which Parliament insisted should be shared by the London and Brighton Railway (L&BR) route to Brighton, and the South Eastern Railway (SER) route to Dover. As a result, there have been two railway stations at Merstham.

London and Brighton Railway station
The original station was located 3/4 mile south of the current station. It was opened by the L&BR on 1 December 1841, and from 1842 it was also used by SER and was the point at which travellers between the two railways exchanged trains. The section of line between Coulsdon and Redhill was transferred to SER operation, and the new owners decided to close Merstham station on 1 October 1843, thereby forcing passengers wishing to change trains to walk between the two stations at Redhill. This was a tactic to force the L&BR to share the new SER Reigate station at Redhill. 
Once the L&BR had given way and closed their existing station at Reigate Road, Redhill, the SER opened a new station at Merstham on the present site.

South Eastern Railway station
This station was opened 4 October 1844. The up side booking office (badly damaged by fire in the late 1980s and later rebuilt) and footbridge date from a 1905 rebuilding.

Despite being on the Brighton line, this station, along with Coulsdon South and Redhill, was owned by the South Eastern Railway (later South Eastern & Chatham Railway), and was not used by L&BR (later London Brighton and South Coast Railway trains. It was not until the creation of the Southern Railway in 1923 that trains from the Brighton line called at the station.

Services 
Services at Merstham are operated by Southern and Thameslink using  and  EMUs.

The typical off-peak service in trains per hour is:
 2 tph to 
 2 tph to  via 
 2 tph to 
 2 tph to  via 

On Sundays, the service between London and Reigate reduces to hourly. In addition, the Peterborough to Horsham service also reduces to hourly and northbound, runs only as far as London Bridge.

Oyster extension 
As of January 2016, Oyster and contactless payment cards can be used from this station.

References

External links 

Railway stations in Surrey
Former South Eastern Railway (UK) stations
Railway stations in Great Britain opened in 1841
Railway stations in Great Britain closed in 1843
Railway stations in Great Britain opened in 1844
Railway stations served by Govia Thameslink Railway